Level Green is a census-designated place located in Penn Township, Westmoreland County in the state of Pennsylvania, United States.  The community is located near Pennsylvania Route 130.  As of the 2010 census,  the population was 4,020 residents. It is the home of the legendary NASCAR veteran Norm Benning.

Demographics

References

Census-designated places in Westmoreland County, Pennsylvania
Census-designated places in Pennsylvania